The Rocky Mountain Outlook is a weekly local newspaper based in Canmore, Alberta, Canada. The Rocky Mountain Outlook is delivered across the Bow Valley in Banff, Canmore, Lake Louise, the Municipal District of Bighorn and the Stoney Nakoda First Nation. The paper covers news in and around the Bow Valley region, which spans from Lake Louise in the west to the Stoney Nakoda First Nation and Kananaskis Country in the east. The paper does not charge readers and relies on advertising for income.

History 
The Rocky Mountain Outlook was officially launched on September 20, 2001, to serve the Bow Valley region. It was created and financed by longtime residents Larry Marshall, Bob Schott and Carol Picard and competed against the Canmore Leader and the Banff Crag and Canyon. Schott became the sales manager, Picard – a former editor of the Canmore Leader – was named the editor and Marshall, who was a former managing editor of both the Canmore Leader and Banff Crag and Canyon, was the publisher.

The newspaper joined the Canadian Community Newspaper Association and Alberta Weekly Newspaper Association in 2004 and the paper was sold to Black Press Media in 2005. The newspaper was purchased by Great West Newspapers from Black Press Media in 2010.

Readership 
The Rocky Mountain Outlook is available throughout the Bow Valley region of Alberta. It is available for pick-up in Canmore, Banff, Exshaw, Morley and Lake Louise at more than 200 locations. The readership is primarily in the municipalities of Canmore, Banff, Kananaskis Country, the Municipal District of Bighorn, the Stoney Nakoda First Nation and Lake Louise.

Their content is available on their website and a free e-edition that is released on Thursday's. The newspaper also has a presence in multiple social media forums such as Facebook, Twitter and Instagram and reach a local, provincial, national and international audience on a daily basis. There is also a Monday to Friday newsletter delivered via email each evening.

Newsroom 
The Rocky Mountain Outlook is based in Canmore at 1001 6 Avenue and the newsroom is in the building's second floor. The newspaper has editorial and advertising staff as well as an office manager.

The newspaper has been recognized both provincially and nationally at the Alberta Weekly Newspaper awards, the Canadian Association of Journalists awards, the News Photographers Association of Canada, the Canadian Community Newspaper Association awards, the Canadian Journalism Foundation awards and the National Newspaper Awards.   Staff has been recognized for their news, sports, Indigenous and political coverage and their photography work. The newspaper received the best all-round newspaper award from the CCNA for circulation between 6,500–12,499 in 2019.

The editor is Greg Colgan and the publisher is Jason Lyon.

See also
List of newspapers in Canada
List of newspapers in Alberta
Media in Alberta
Media in Banff, Alberta

References

External links
 Rocky Mountain Outlook
Great West Newspapers

Weekly newspapers published in Alberta
Newspaper companies of Canada
Companies based in Alberta
Canmore, Alberta